Shahrukhiya is a site of ancient settlement located 88 km to the southwest of Tashkent, Uzbekistan, on the right coast of Syrdarya River. It is the first large city of the Tashkent oases, situated on the Great Silk Road through Yaksart (Syrdarya). In the oriental sources, it was famous under the name Benaket, and the portion of the Great Silk Road direction called by its name.

Background
Shahrukhiya consisted of a citadel, two cities' territories, and a wide trade craft suburb (a "rabad"), in a total area of 400 hectares. Fortress walls with towers are surrounded by the citadel, Shahristan, and rabad. The walls were erected by Amir Timur Beg Gurkani, he named the city after his youngest son Shahrukh Mirza as Shahrukhiya in 1392. Archeological research has discovered fortification constructions, handicraft workshops of potters and glass blowers, bazaar areas, systems of municipal improvements on the city, and the remains of the front residential constructions of the Epoch of Timurids and Khanate of Bukhara. The memorial complex, "Shomir-kara ovlia", functioned in the northwestern part of Rabad in the 16th century. The traces of the memorial mosque of Abdullah Khan I were preserved here, that was built for Shah Emir Asadullah, the ishan of Shahrukhiya, and a marble grave. A site of ancient settlement of Shahrukhiya existed from the 3rd-4th century until the 18th century. Originally, it was a small city at the passage, but it became a huge city during the 10th-11th century. It was destroyed by the Mongols, and later reconstructed by Amir Timur, and named Shahrukhiya. Since that time, it became an important economic and cultural center in the state of the Timurids and Shaybanids. The city had its own mint, and outstanding scientists, poets, penmen, and artists have lived here.

World Heritage Status
This site was added to the UNESCO World Heritage Tentative List on 18 January 2008, in the Cultural category.

Notes

Archaeological sites in Uzbekistan
Central Asia
Uzbekistani culture
World Heritage Tentative List